Sega Genesis Collection  (Sega Mega Drive Collection in PAL regions) is a compilation of video games developed by Digital Eclipse and published by Sega for PlayStation 2 and PlayStation Portable. The collection includes twenty-eight Sega Genesis games from a variety of genres, as well as unlockable classic Sega arcade games, with different sets of arcade games for the PlayStation 2 and PlayStation Portable versions. A sequel was released in 2009 called Sonic's Ultimate Genesis Collection for PlayStation 3 and Xbox 360.

List of games

Sega Genesis

Alex Kidd in the Enchanted Castle
Altered Beast
Bonanza Bros.
Columns
Comix Zone
Decap Attack
Ecco the Dolphin
Ecco: The Tides of Time
Ecco Jr. †
Flicky
Gain Ground
Golden Axe
Golden Axe II
Golden Axe III
Kid Chameleon
Phantasy Star II
Phantasy Star III: Generations of Doom
Phantasy Star IV: The End of the Millennium
Ristar
Shadow Dancer: The Secret of Shinobi † / ††
Shinobi III: Return of the Ninja Master
Sonic the Hedgehog
Sonic the Hedgehog 2
Super Thunder Blade
Sword of Vermilion †
Vectorman
Vectorman 2
Virtua Fighter 2 †

† Not available in Sonic's Ultimate Genesis Collection.
†† Not available in the PAL release.

Unlockable extra games
This collection also features more than thirty-five minutes of unlockable interviews from Sega of Japan, a "museum" with facts about the games, strategy tips and box art for each game, as well as a "Sega Cheat Sheet" that consists of cheat codes for most games, and a set of unlockable arcade games, (some of which are from the early Sega/Gremlin era). The collection also contains unlockable trailers for Phantasy Star Universe and Virtua Fighter 5.

PlayStation 2

Altered Beast (arcade)
Future Spy (arcade) †
Tac/Scan (arcade) †
Zaxxon (arcade)
Zektor (arcade) †

PlayStation Portable

Astro Blaster (arcade) †
Congo Bongo (arcade) (under original title "Tip Top" in some regions)
Eliminator (arcade) †
Space Fury (arcade) †
Super Zaxxon (arcade) †

† Not available in Sonic's Ultimate Genesis Collection.

Reception

Sega Genesis Collection received "generally favorable" reviews, according to review aggregator Metacritic.

References

2006 video games
Multiplayer and single-player video games
PlayStation 2 games
PlayStation Portable games
Sega Genesis
Sega video game compilations
Video games developed in the United States
Digital Eclipse games